Mohammed Arif Ilahi, MD, MRCP (born July 1, 1935) was a Pakistani physician and former professional tennis player. He was the son of Col. Dr. Ilahi Bakhsh MD, MRCP who was Muhammad Ali Jinnah's personal physician.

While competing on the international circuit, Ilahi played one Davis Cup tie for Pakistan, when they played India in Patna in 1970. He featured in the final reverse singles rubber against Vijay Amritraj, which was abandoned at 5–5 in the fourth set, with the Indian leading two sets to one. 

Ilahi appeared in the main draw of the 1970 US Open and made it to the second round, by beating Steve Krulevitz in five sets. In 1971 he participated in the qualifying draws for the French Open and Wimbledon Championships.

During his tennis career Ilahi was Assistant Professor of Medicine at his Alma Mater King Edward Medical College, Lahore and later settled and practiced as a physician in Baytown, Texas.

References

External links
 
 
 
 

1935 births
Living people
Pakistani male tennis players
Pakistani emigrants to the United States